An Anthology of Dead Ends is an Extended play by Botch, released on Hydra Head Records in October 2002. It was the band's final studio recording, and was released after they disbanded.

The album was released on 10" vinyl and CD; a 12" version was eventually released. The CD version is an enhanced CD containing a photo gallery, a music video for "Saint Matthew Returns to the Womb" and album credits. It was released in a digipak case as well as a standard jewel case.

The song "Afghamistam" is mostly a departure from previous work, featuring subdued vocals, piano and overdubbed spoken word segments.

Track listing
"Spaim" – 0:14
"Japam" – 2:51
"Framce" – 3:40
"Vietmam" – 3:59
"Afghamistam" – 6:57
"Micaragua" – 3:57

Personnel
David Verellen – vocals
David Knudson – guitars
Brian Cook – bass guitar, piano, backing vocals
Tim Latona – drums
John Pettibone – backing vocals

References

Botch (band) albums
2002 EPs
Albums produced by Matt Bayles
Hydra Head Records EPs